Zadok Amani or Alamani was a 12th-century Jewish liturgical poet.

He wrote the following eight poems that are found in the Tripolitan Maḥzor: (1) El hekhal ḳodsho; (2) Le-bet el banu; (3) La-Adonai et yom ha-shevi'i berakh; (4) Meḥolel kol be-ḳav yashar; (5) Ezri yavi el me-'ayin; (6) Al rov 'avoni; (7) Ammekha le-shaḥarekha ḳamu; and (8) Ki bo Elohim dibber be-ḳodsho. No. 3 consists of thirteen strophes, and each of the others consists of five strophes. Nos. 3, 4, 7, and 8 are to be recited on the Sabbaths of the month of Elul. Nos. 3 and 8 are both mustajabs; in the former every strophe begins with "la-Adonai" and terminates with "Adonai," while in the latter the strophes begin with "ki bo" and rime in "to."

External links
 Poems by Imani at the National Library of Israel

References
 

12th-century Jews
12th-century poets
Hebrew-language poets
Medieval Jewish poets